Heffron is an unincorporated community in the towns of Belmont and Rose in Portage and Waushara Counties, Wisconsin, United States.

Geography

Heffron is located in central Wisconsin approximately five miles east of Almond and five miles south of Blaine at the intersection of Portage County Highway AA, and the town roads of Akron Avenue and Heffron Road. (Lat: 44° 14'  35.7", Lon: -89° 18' 24.3")

History
Heffron was home to St. John the Baptist Catholic Church and a post office in its earlier days. The church still stands, but its congregation has since merged with several others into St. Maximillian Kolbe's Parish in Lanark. The community was named for John J. Heffron, a real estate developer from Stevens Point.

Emmons Creek Fishery Area
Some consider Heffron and Dopp to be closely related, because of their proximity. Both are linked by the local snowmobile trail, and have an association with nearby Emmons Creek Fishery Area.

References

Unincorporated communities in Wisconsin
Unincorporated communities in Portage County, Wisconsin
Unincorporated communities in Waushara County, Wisconsin